Miryam Veruzhka Tristán Mancilla (born 19 April 1985) is a Peruvian footballer who plays as a left winger for Alianza Lima and the Peru women's national team.

International career
Tristán represented Peru at the 2004 South American U-19 Women's Championship. At senior level, she played three Copa América Femenina editions (2003, 2006 and 2010) and the 2019 Pan American Games.

International goals
Scores and results list Peru's goal tally first

References

External links

1985 births
Living people
Women's association football wingers
Peruvian women's footballers
Footballers from Lima
Peru women's international footballers
Pan American Games competitors for Peru
Footballers at the 2019 Pan American Games
Sport Boys footballers
Deportivo Municipal footballers
Peruvian expatriate footballers
Expatriate footballers in Panama
Peruvian women's futsal players